Manukau Heads Lighthouse is a lighthouse situated on the Āwhitu Peninsula, at the Manukau Heads, the entrance to the Manukau Harbour in Auckland, New Zealand.

History 

The lighthouse is close to the location of the HMS Orpheus disaster in February 1863. Around the year 1870, the signal station located on Paratutae Island was moved south, close to the location of the lighthouse.

The Manukau Heads Lighthouse was constructed in 1874. Its wooden design was influential, and replicated across New Zealand. It was also the first lighthouse to burn kerosene in New Zealand.

In the early 21st century, the lighthouse was refurbished to the original design. In February 2023, the lighthouse became inaccessible due to landslips caused by Cyclone Gabrielle.

See also 

 List of lighthouses in New Zealand

References

External links 
 

Lighthouses completed in 1873
Lighthouses in New Zealand
1870s architecture in New Zealand
Transport buildings and structures in the Auckland Region
Manukau Harbour